Opuwo was a constituency in the Kunene Region of Namibia.  Its population in 2010 was 20,119, its administrative capital was Opuwo. 

Opuwo Constituency was dissolved in August 2013, in preparation for the 2014 general election. Following a recommendation of the Fourth Delimitation Commission of Namibia the new constituencies Opuwo Urban (comprising the townlands and immediate surroundings of Opuwo), and Opuwo Rural (comprising the remainder of Opuwo Constituency) were created.

References

Constituencies of Kunene Region
1992 establishments in Namibia
States and territories established in 1992
2013 disestablishments in Namibia
States and territories disestablished in 2013